Orelia Eleta Merchant (born 1971) is an American lawyer serving as chief deputy attorney general for state counsel in the New York Attorney General's Office. She is a nominee to serve as a judge of the United States District Court for the Eastern District of New York.

Education 
Merchant earned a Bachelor of Science degree in physics and mathematics from Dillard University in 1992, a Master of Arts in marine science from the College of William & Mary in 1995, and a Juris Doctor from the Tulane University Law School in 1998.

Career 

From 1998 to 2002, Merchant served as Assistant Regional Counsel in the United States Environmental Protection Agency. In 2000 and 2001, Merchant served as a special assistant United States attorney in the United States Attorney's Office for the Eastern District of Louisiana. Merchant served as an assistant United States attorney in the United States Attorney's Office for the Eastern District of New York from 2002 to 2016 and executive assistant United States attorney from 2016 to 2019. She joined the New York Attorney General's Office in 2019.

Nomination to district court 

Merchant was recommended to President Joe Biden by Senator Chuck Schumer. On September 2, 2022, President Biden announced his intent to nominate Merchant to serve as a United States district judge of the United States District Court for the Eastern District of New York. On September 6, 2022, her nomination was sent to the Senate. President Biden nominated Merchant to the seat vacated by Judge William Francis Kuntz, who assumed senior status on January 1, 2022. On January 3, 2023, her nomination was returned to the President under Rule XXXI, Paragraph 6 of the United States Senate. She was renominated on January 23, 2023. On January 25, 2023, a hearing on her nomination was held before the Senate Judiciary Committee. Her nomination is pending before the Senate Judiciary Committee.

References 

1971 births
Living people
College of William & Mary alumni
Dillard University alumni
Louisiana lawyers
New York (state) lawyers
People from the Bronx
Tulane University Law School alumni